Jamie Thompson Dawson (July 9, 1922 – May 30, 2009), commonly mis-known as "Jim" or "Jimmy" Dawson, was an American professional basketball player. He played in the National Basketball League for the Sheboygan Red Skins in 10 games during the 1946–47 season.

Dawson had played collegiately at Texas A&M University between 1942 and 1946. As a senior in 1945–46 he led the Aggies in scoring at 17.0 points per game and was named an all-Southwest Conference player. After his brief professional career, Dawson moved to Longview, Texas in 1951 and established the Fredonia Animal Hospital where he served as a veterinarian until 1976.

References

1922 births
2009 deaths
American veterinarians
Male veterinarians
Basketball players from Texas
Centers (basketball)
People from Longview, Texas
Sheboygan Red Skins players
Texas A&M Aggies men's basketball players
American men's basketball players